Eupithecia swanni is a moth in the family Geometridae that is endemic to Burma.

The forewings are pale brown.

References

Moths described in 2009
Endemic fauna of Myanmar
Moths of Asia
swanni